The weightlifting competition at the 1968 Summer Olympics in Mexico City consisted of seven weight classes, all for men only. The competition was held from 17 to 21 October 1968.

It also counted as 1968 World Weightlifting Championships. Soviet Union finished first in medal table after winning three gold medals. Japan, Iran, Finland and Poland won the remaining gold medals.

Medal summary

Medal table

See also
 World Weightlifting Championships

References

External links
 

 
1968 Summer Olympics events
1968
1968
1968 in weightlifting
Weightlifting in Mexico